The Coral gas field is a natural gas field located offshore the Cabo Delgado Province. It was discovered in 2012 and developed by and Eni. It began production in 2012 and produces natural gas and condensates. The total proven reserves of the Coral gas field are around 10 trillion cubic feet (286 km³), and production is slated to be around 100 million cubic feet/day (2.9×105m³).

References

Natural gas fields in Mozambique